Behind Mansion Walls is an American documentary television series on Investigation Discovery that debuted on June 6, 2011. The series, hosted by Christopher Mason, tells the stories of crime and investigation that are unveiled in wealthy families and relationships, with conspiracies, hidden accounts, false identities and secret affairs. It tells stories of murder and mystery on a grand scale. The victims and individuals involved in cases come from upscale levels of society, from oil tycoons to real estate moguls.

Episodes

Season 1 (2011)

Season 2 (2012)

Season 3 (2013)

Further reading
The Millionaire's Wife, by Cathy Scott, a true crime book about Barbara Kogan and her husband's murder that is featured in the June 2012 "The Killer Inside" episode.

References

External links
Official website

Christopher Mason official website

2010s American television news shows
2011 American television series debuts
2013 American television series endings
2010s American crime television series
American non-fiction television series
Investigation Discovery original programming
Television series by Beyond Television Productions
True crime television series